Michael Edward Conley is a brigadier general in the United States Air Force who serves as the director of strategic plans, requirements, and programs of the Air Mobility Command. He previously served as the deputy commander of the Combined Force Space Component Command. Prior to that, he was commander of the 1st Special Operations Wing of the United States Air Force.

Conley was born and raised in Geneva, New York. He was commissioned to the U.S. Air Force in May 1996 after graduating from the United States Air Force Academy. He also completed pilot training in 1998, and since then, has flown the UH-1N and MH-53 helicopters, and the CV-22 tilt-rotor aircraft. Also during his Air Force career, Conley served as special assistant to the chairman of the Joint Chiefs of Staff. In 2005, he was named Air Force Special Operations Pilot of the Year. Conley holds three master's degrees, including a degree in national security and strategic studies from the Naval War College.

In March 2022, Conley was reassigned as director of strategic plans, requirements, and programs of the Air Mobility Command.

Education 

 1996  Bachelor of Science, U.S. Air Force Academy, Colorado
 2000  Squadron Officer's School, Maxwell AFB, Alabama
 2004  M.S. in management, University of Maryland, University College, Maryland
 2006  Air Command and Staff College, by correspondence
 2008  M.A. in communication, George Mason University, Virginia (AF Intern Program)
 2010  Air War College, by correspondence
 2014  M.A. in national security and strategic studies, U.S. Naval War College, Rhode Island
 2017 Air Force Enterprise Leadership Seminar, Kenan-Flagler Business School, University of North Carolina, North Carolina

Assignments 
 1997–1997, student pilot, T-37, Vance AFB, Oklahoma
 1997–1998, student pilot, UN-1H, Ft. Rucker, Alabama
 1998–2001, UH-1N IP/executive officer, 1st Helicopter Squadron, Andrews AFB, Maryland
 2001–2002, student pilot, MH-53J, 551 SOS, Kirtland AFB, New Mexico
 2002–2004, MH-53J/M instructor pilot, 20 SOS, Hurlburt Field, Florida
 2004–2006, MH-53M evaluator pilot/flight commander, 21st SOS, RAF Mildenhall, United Kingdom
 2006–2007, assistant operations officer, 352 OSS, RAF Mildenhall, United Kingdom
 2007–2008, AF Intern Program-Strategic Communication, George Mason University, Fairfax, Virginia
 2008–2009, chief of operations team, SAF/PA, Headquarters U.S. Air Force, Arlington, Virginia
 2009–2011, chief of wing safety/CV-22 pilot, 1 SOW, Hurlburt Field, Florida
 2011–2013, commander, 58 OSS, Kirtland AFB, New Mexico
 2013–2014, student, U.S. Naval War College, Newport, Rhode Island
 2014–2015, branch chief, Joint Staff, J-7, Joint Lessons Learned Division, Pentagon, Arlington, Virginia
 2015–2016, deputy director, CAG/special assistant to the CJCS, Pentagon, Arlington, Virginia
 2016–2018, vice commander, 27 SOW, Cannon AFB, New Mexico
 2018–2020, commander, 1 SOW, Hurlburt Field, Florida
 2020–present, deputy combined force space component commander, U.S. Space Command, Vandenberg AFB, California

Awards and decorations 
 Legion of Merit with oak leaf cluster
 Bronze Star
 Defense Meritorious Service Medal
 Meritorious Service Medal with two oak leaf clusters
 Air Medal with five oak leaf clusters
 Aerial Achievement Medal with six oak leaf clusters
 Air Force Commendation Medal with two oak leaf clusters
 Air Force Achievement Medal
 Air Force Combat Action Medal
 Humanitarian Service Medal
 2005 Air Force Special Operations Command Pilot of the Year

Effective dates of promotion 
Conley was nominated for the rank of brigadier general on January 9, 2020, and was sworn in June 2020.

References 

 

 
 

 

Living people
Year of birth missing (living people)
Place of birth missing (living people)
Space Operations Command personnel
United States Air Force generals
Brigadier generals
United States Air Force Academy alumni
University System of Maryland alumni
George Mason University alumni
Naval War College alumni
Recipients of the Legion of Merit